The Lake Charles Symphony is located in Lake Charles, Louisiana. It has about 50 players in the orchestra and it was conducted by Bohuslav Rattay (2010-2018). It regularly performs in the Rosa Hart Theatre. It was originally formed in 1938, and reorganized after World War II.

References

External links
The official website of the Lake Charles Symphony

American orchestras
Lake Charles, Louisiana
Tourist attractions in Calcasieu Parish, Louisiana
Performing arts in Louisiana
Musical groups from Louisiana
Musical groups established in 1938
1938 establishments in Louisiana